North Carrizo Creek forms in Baca County, Colorado at the confluence of East Carrizo Creek and West Carrizo Creek, at a point about 6 miles north of the Preston Monument, the tripoint of Colorado, Oklahoma and New Mexico.  North Carrizo Creek then flows generally south-southeast into Oklahoma to join the Cimarron River northeast of Kenton, Oklahoma. 
   
The creek has also been known as Carrizo Creek, Carrizozo Creek, Carrizzo Creek, and 
North Carrizozo Creek.  (There is a Carrizozo Creek in the area, but it joins the Cimarron River to the west.)

See also
South Carrizo Creek
Carrizo Creek (New Mexico/Texas)
Carrizo Creek (Arizona)
Carrizozo Creek

References

Rivers of Colorado
Rivers of Baca County, Colorado
Rivers of Oklahoma
Rivers of Cimarron County, Oklahoma